Twelve male athletes were representing Iraq at the 1996 Summer Paralympics in Atlanta, United States.

See also
1996 Summer Paralympics

References 

Nations at the 1996 Summer Paralympics
Paralympics
1996